Chris Stone (born 24 February 1959) is an Australian businessman and former Australian rules footballer. He is the husband of former Belgian prime minister Sophie Wilmès.

Early life
Stone is from Sandy Bay, Tasmania, Australia. He played with St Kilda in the Victorian Football League (VFL).

Business career
After leaving university, Stone began working with the Australian division of Pearl & Dean, a cinema advertising company. He moved to the UK in 1988 and in 1991 became regional sales director of Mills & Allen Outdoor. He transferred to Belgium in 1994 as CEO of Vivendi's Belgian division, comprising Belgoposter Outdoor, Claude Publicité and other media companies. In 1998, Stone joined RMB International as chief operating officer (COO). He bought his own outdoor advertising company, Dewez, in 2001. Since 2012 he has been president of the Belgian branch of Australian Business in Europe (ABIE).

Personal life
He is married to Sophie Wilmès, the former foreign minister and former prime minister of Belgium.

Notes

External links 

Living people
1959 births
Australian rules footballers from Victoria (Australia)
St Kilda Football Club players
Australian expatriates in Belgium
Husbands of national leaders
Australian mass media businesspeople
Australian rules footballers from Hobart